(born January 17, 1979 in Tadaoka, Osaka) is a Japanese short track speed skater. He won a gold medal on the 500 m at the 1998 Winter Olympics in Nagano.

Now, Nishitani practices Keirin.

References

External links

RACERPROFILE(日本語) - Keirin(競輪)
 Takafumi Nishitani at ISU

1979 births
Living people
Japanese male short track speed skaters
Olympic short track speed skaters of Japan
Olympic gold medalists for Japan
Olympic medalists in short track speed skating
Short track speed skaters at the 1998 Winter Olympics
Short track speed skaters at the 2002 Winter Olympics
Short track speed skaters at the 2006 Winter Olympics
Sportspeople from Osaka Prefecture
Medalists at the 1998 Winter Olympics
Asian Games medalists in short track speed skating
Asian Games silver medalists for Japan
Asian Games bronze medalists for Japan
Short track speed skaters at the 2003 Asian Winter Games
Medalists at the 2003 Asian Winter Games
Universiade medalists in short track speed skating
World Short Track Speed Skating Championships medalists
People from Tadaoka, Osaka
Universiade gold medalists for Japan
Universiade silver medalists for Japan
Universiade bronze medalists for Japan
Competitors at the 1999 Winter Universiade
Competitors at the 2001 Winter Universiade
20th-century Japanese people